Vitale De Stefano (1889-1959) was an Italian actor and film director of the silent era. He played the role of Masinissa in Giovanni Pastrone's epic Cabiria in 1914.

Selected filmography
 The Last Days of Pompeii (1913)
 Cabiria (1914)
 Paolina (1915)
 The Son of the Red Corsair (1921)

References

Bibliography

 Jacqueline Reich. The Maciste Films of Italian Silent Cinema. Indiana University Press, 2015.

External links

1889 births
1959 deaths
Italian male film actors
Italian male silent film actors
20th-century Italian male actors
People from Acireale
Actors from Sicily
Film people from Sicily

it:Vitale De Stefano